Employee monitoring software is a means of employee monitoring, and allows company administrators to monitor and supervise all their employee computers from a central location. It is normally deployed over a business network and allows for easy centralized log viewing via one central networked PC. Sometimes, companies opt to monitor their employees using remote desktop software instead.

Purpose 
Employee monitoring software is used to supervise employees' performance, prevent illegal activities, avoid confidential info leakage, and catch insider threats. Nowadays employee monitoring software is widely used in technology companies.

Features 
An employee monitoring program can monitor almost everything on a computer, such as keystrokes and passwords inputted, websites visited, chats in Facebook Messenger, Skype and other social chats. A piece of monitoring software can also capture screenshots of mobile activities. E-mail monitoring includes employers having access to records of employee’s e-mails that are sent through the company’s servers. Companies may use keyword searches to natural language processing to analyze e-mails. The administrator can view the logs through a cloud panel, or receive the logs by email.

Criticism
Bossware, also known as tattleware, is software that allows supervisors to automatically monitor the productivity of their employees. Common features of bossware include activity monitoring, screenshotting and/or screen recording, keystroke logging, webcam and/or microphone activation, and "invisible" monitoring. Bossware has been called a form of spyware. During the COVID-19 pandemic, the use of bossware by companies to monitor their employees increased.

The Electronic Frontier Foundation (EFF) denounced bossware as a violation of privacy. The Center for Democracy and Technology (CDT) denounced bossware as a threat to the safety and health of employees.

During the COVID-19 pandemic, members of the r/antiwork subreddit shared various mouse jiggler strategies to combat bossware intended to monitor the productivity of remote workers.

A study by Reports and Data predicts that the global market for employee remote monitoring software will hit $1.3 billion by 2027.

See also 
Computer surveillance
Computer surveillance in the workplace
Job satisfaction
Malware
Spyware
Trojan horse
User activity monitoring

References

Business software
Computer security software
Computer surveillance
Labor
Spyware
Deception
Espionage devices
Espionage techniques